Oliveto Citra is a town and comune in the province of Salerno in the Campania region of south-western Italy.

History
Archaeological discoveries in the vicinity have unearthed artifacts dating as far back as the 6th century B.C. The castle of Oliveto was first mentioned in documents in 1114, when Santa Maria de Foris, in the hamlet of Oliveto, was given to the archbishop of Conza by Count Quaimario Giffoni. Later that century, the manor was owned by the French Norman, William of toille (Tuilla). Until the Risorgimento, the castle was the seat of feudal lords and local barons.

On May 24, 1985 it is alleged that the Blessed Virgin Mary made an appearance in Oliveto Citra, holding a baby. Over 100 villagers signed statements confessing to seeing the apparition. According to cultural anthropologist Paolo Apolito, these visitations are controversial and have not yet been approved by the Roman Catholic Church.

Geography
The comune contains the following frazioni: Casale (pop. 92), Dogana (pop. 40), Ponte Oliveto (pop. 8) and Serroni (pop. 85). The principal road is the Strada statale 691 Fondo Valle Sele (SS 691). That and the Sele River pass the town on the eastern side. There is a natural area in the comune known as "Piano di Canale". The large, heavily forested Parco Regionale Dei Monti Picentini is in the northwest. There is an industrial estate, Zona Industriale Staglioni, to the north of the town, near the village of Dogana.

Landmarks
The commune contains an 11–12th century castle, Castello Guerritore. An old stone pathway leads up to the castle from the Piazza Garibaldi square. The main churches are Chiesa di Santa Maria della Misericordia (1775), Chiesa Madonna delle Grazie (1497)  and Santuario Madonna della Consolazione (17th century).

Religion 
The majority of the population are Catholic. The municipality belongs to the Roman Catholic Archdiocese of Salerno-Campagna-Acerno, within the Santa Maria della Misericordia parish. There is also a Protestant community; the CCEVAS Pentecostal Church has been present since about 1950.

Notable people
Vincenzo Indelli (1908–2000), politician

References

External links
Official site 

Cities and towns in Campania
Localities of Cilento